The Missouri Pacific Railroad bridge was built in 1909, by the MoPac. In 1984 it was merged with Union Pacific in the Missouri Pacific-Union Pacific merger. The bridge is upstream of I-670, over the Kansas River. 
It is open to traffic.

It is the sister bridge to the Union Pacific Intermodal Bridge.

Bridges over the Kansas River
Railroad bridges in Missouri
Bridges completed in 1909
Union Pacific Railroad bridges
Missouri Pacific Railroad